This is a list of the butterflies of China belonging to the family Pieridae and an index to the species articles. This forms part of the full list of butterflies of China. 438 species or subspecies of Pieridae are recorded from China.

Pieridae
genus: Anthocharis
Anthocharis cardamines (Linnaeus, 1758) China
A. c. alexandra (Hemming, 1933) Tian-Shan
A. c. koreana Matsumura, 1937 Amur, Ussuri
Anthocharis bieti (Oberthür, 1884) China, Tibet
A. b. tsangpoana (Riley, 1928) Tsangpo
Anthocharis bambusarum Oberthür, 1876
Anthocharis scolymus (Butler, 1866)
Anthocharis thibetana (Oberthür, 1886) West China
genus: Aporia
Aporia crataegi (Linnaeus, 1758)
A. c. tianschanica Rühl, [1893] Tian Shan
A. c. pseudohippia Verity, 1911 Tibet
A. c. ussurica Kardakoff, 1928 Amur, Ussuri
Aporia howarthi Bernardi, 1961 Tibet, Lilung Valley
Aporia bieti (Oberthür, 1884)
A. b. bieti (Oberthür, 1884) West China, Tibet
A. b. gregoryi Watkins, 1927 Yunnan
A. b. transiens Alphéraky, 1897 Tibet
Aporia hippia (Bremer, 1861)
A. h. hippia (Bremer, 1861) Amur, Ussuri
A. h. thibetana Grum-Grshimailo, 1893 Manchuria
Aporia procris Leech, 1890
A. p. procris Leech, 1890 North Yunnan, Sichuan
A. p. draesekei (Bang-Haas, 1927) Yunnan
A. p. sinensis (Bang-Haas, 1927) Kansu
A. p. nyanchuensis Yoshino, 1998 Tibet
Aporia leucodice (Eversmann, 1843)
A. l. illumina (Grum-Grshimailo, 1890) Tian Shan
Aporia martineti (Oberthür, 1884)
A. m. martineti (Oberthür, 1884) Yunnan, Sichuan
A. m. konbogyandaensis Yoshino, 1998 Tibet
Aporia intercostata Bang-Haas, 1927 North China
Aporia potanini Alphéraky, 1892 West China
Aporia lhamo (Oberthür, 1893) Yunnan
Aporia goutellei (Oberthür, 1886)
A. g. tsinglingica Verity, 1911 Yunnan
A. g. extrema South, 1913 Tibet
Aporia genestieri (Oberthür, 1902) Yunnan
Aporia delavayi (Oberthür, 1890)
A. d. delavayi (Oberthür, 1890) North Yunnan, Sichuan, East Tibet
A. d. minschani Bang-Haas, 1933
A. d. dayiensis Yoshino, 1998 Sichuan
Aporia larraldei (Oberthür, 1876)
A. l. larraldei (Oberthür, 1876) Sichuan
A. l. nutans (Oberthür, 1892) Yunnan
A. l. melania (Oberthür, 1892) Sichuan
Aporia kaolinkonensis Yoshino, 1997
Aporia gigantea Koiwaya, 1993 Sichuan
Aporia acraea (Oberthür, 1885)
A. a. lotis (Leech, 1890) Sichuan
A. a. wolongensis Yoshino, 1995 Sichuan
Aporia tayiensis Yoshino, 1995 Sichuan
Aporia largeteaui (Oberthür, 1881)
A. l. kuangtungensis Mell, 1935 China
A. l. pacifica (Mell, 1943) South China
A. l. schmackeri (Mell, 1943) South China
Aporia oberthuri (Leech, 1890) China
Aporia hastata (Oberthür, 1892) Yunnan
Aporia joubini (Oberthür, 1913) China
Aporia monbeigi (Oberthür, 1917)
A. m. monbeigi (Oberthür, 1917) North Yunnan (Weixi)
A. m. meiliensis Yoshino, 1995 North Yunnan (Dequin)
Aporia harrietae (de Nicéville, [1893])
A. h. baileyi South, 1913 North Yunnan
Aporia agathon (Gray, 1831)
A. a. agathon (Gray, 1831) Southwest China
A. a. lemoulti Bernardi, 1945 Sichuan
A. a. bifurcata Tytler, 1939 Yunnan
A. a. omotoi Yoshino, 2003 North Yunnan
Aporia nishimurai Koiwaya, 1989 Sichuan
Aporia shinnooka Yoshino, 2001 Hupei
Aporia kamei Koiwaya, 1989
Aporia kanekoi Koiwaya, 1989
genus: Appias
Appias albina  (Boisduval, 1836)
 A. a. darada (C. & R. Felder, [1865]) Hainan, West China
Appias paulina (Cramer, [1777])
 A. p. adamsoni (Moore, [1905]) South West China
Appias indra (Moore, 1857)
 A. i. thronion  (Fruhstorfer, 1910 Yunnan
 A. i. menandrus Fruhstorfer, 1910 Hainan, South. China
 A. i. aristoxemus Fruhstorfer, 1908
Appias libythea  (Fabricius, 1775)
Appias lyncida (Cramer, [1777])
 A. l. formosana (Wallace, 1866) Taiwan
 A. l. inornata  Moore, 1878 Hainan, South. China
Appias lalage (Doubleday, 1842)
 A. l. lalage Yunnan
 A. l. lageloides  (Crowley, 1900) Hainan
Appias lalassis Grose-Smith, 1887
 A. l. lalassis Yuunan
Appias nero  (Fabricius, 1793)
genus: Baltia
Baltia butleri Alphéraky, 1889
genus: Catopsilia
Catopsilia pomona (Fabricius, 1775)
Catopsilia pyranthe (Linnaeus, 1758)
Catopsilia scylla (Linnaeus, 1763)
Catopsilia florella (Fabricius, 1775)
genus: Cepora
Cepora nerissa Fabricius, 1775
Cepora wui Chou, Zhang & Wang, 2001
Cepora nadina  (Lucas, 1852)
Cepora judith  (Fabricius, 1787)
genus: Colias
Colias alfacariensis Ribbe, 1905
Colias hyale (Linnaeus, 1758)
C. h. alta Staudinger, 1886 Tian-Shan
C. h. novasinensis Reissinger, 1989 Gansu
Colias erate (Esper, 1805)
C. e. amdensis Verity, 1911 Qinghai, Gansu, Sichuan
C. e. sinensis Verity, 1911 Yunnan, Manchuria
C. e. poliographus Motschulsky, 1860 Amur, Ussuri, Sakhalin, Tian Shan
Colias tyche (Böber, 1812) Amur, Mongoli
Colias palaeno (Linnaeus, 1761)
C. p. orientalis Staudinger, 1892 Amur
Colias lada Grum-Grshimailo, 1891 Tibet, Amdo, Gansu
Colias montium Oberthür, 1886 Tibet, Sichuan
C. m. viridis Bang-Haas, 1915 Qinghai
C. m. longto Evans, 1924 Tibet
C. m. fasciata Kocman, 1999 Qinghai
Colias sifanica Grum-Grshimailo, 1891
C. s. sifanica Grum-Grshimailo, 1891 Amdo, Qinghai, Gansu
C. s. herculeana Bollow, 1930 Gansu
Colias aegidii Verhulst, 1990 Gansu, Qinghai
Colias nebulosa Oberthür, 1894
C. n. nebulosa Oberthür, 1894 Sichuan
C. n. karoensis Hoshiai & Rose, 1998 Tibet
C. n. niveata Verity, [1909] Qinghai
C. n. pugo Evans, 1924 Tibet
C. n. sungpani Bang-Haas, 1927 Sichuan, Gansu
C. n. richthofeni O. Bang-Haas, 1927 Qilian Mountains
Colias cocandica Erschoff, 1874
C. c. maja Grum-Grshimailo, 1891 Tian Shan
C. c. pljushtchi Verhulst, 2000 Tian Shan
Colias tamerlana Staudinger, 1897
C. t. tamerlana Staudinger, 1897 Xinjiang
Colias tibetana Riley, 1923 Tibet
Colias grumi Alphéraky, 1897
C. g. aljinshana Huang & Murayama, 1992 Xinjiang
Colias ladakensis C. Felder & R. Felder, 1865 Tibet
Colias nina Fawcett, 1904 Tibet
C. n. nina Fawcett, 1904
C. n. hingstoni Riley, 1923
C. n. tsurpuana Grieshuber, 1996
Colias berylla Fawcett, 1904 Tibet
Colias adelaidae Verhulst, 1991
Colias arida Alphéraky, 1889 Tibet, West China
C. a. arida Alphéraky, 1889
C. a. cakana Rose & Schulte, 1992
C. a. muetingi Rose & Schulte, 1992
C. a. wanda Grum-Grshimailo, 1893
Colias baeckeri Kotzsch, 1930
Colias stoliczkana Moore, 1878
C. s. stoliczkana Moore, 1878 Tibet
C. s. yangguifei Huang & Murayama, 1992 Xinjiang
Colias staudingeri Alphéraky, 1881
C. s. emivittata Verity, 1911 Tien Shan
Colias felderi Grum-Grshimailo, 1891 Tibet, China
Colias leechi Grum-Grshimailo, 1893
Colias regia Grum-Grshimailo, 1887 Tien Shan
Colias romanovi Grum-Grshimailo, 1885 Tien Shan
Colias heos (Herbst, 1792) Mongolia, Ussuri, Southeast China
Colias diva Grum-Grshimailo, 1891 Tibet, West China
Colias erschoffi Alphéraky, 1881 Tien Shan
Colias wiskotti Staudinger, 1882
C. w. draconis Grum-Grshimailo, 1891 Tien Shan
Colias chrysotheme (Esper, 1781) Northeast China
Colias thisoa Ménétriés, 1832 China
C. t. urumtsiensis Verity, 1909 Tian Shan
Colias fieldii Ménétriés, 1855
C. f. fieldii Ménétriés, 1855 Yunnan
C. f. chinensis Verity, 1909 Ussuri
Colias sieversi Grum-Grshimailo, 1887
Colias thrasibulus Fruhstorfer, 1908
Colias dubia Fawcett, 1906
Colias viluiensis Ménétries, 1859
genus: Delias
Delias acalis Godart, 1819
Delias pasithoe  (Linnaeus, 1767)
Delias hyparete  (Linnaeus, 1758)
Delias lativitta Leech, 1893
Delias subnubila  Leech, 1893
Delias wilemani  Jordan, 1925
Delias belladonna (Fabricius, 1793)
Delias sanaca (Moore, 1857)
Delias berinda (Moore, 1872)
Delias agostina Hewitson, 1852
Delias descombesi Boisduval, 1836
genus: Dercas
Dercas lycorias Doubleday 1842
Dercas verhuelli (Hoeven, 1839)
genus: Eurema
Eurema ada (Distant & Pryer, 1887)
Eurema andersoni (Moore, 1886)
E. a. sadanobui Shirôzu & Yata, 1982 Yunnan
Eurema blanda (Boisduval, 1836)
E. b. hylama Corbet & Pendlebury Hainan
E. b. rileyi Corbet & Pendlebury South China
Eurema brigitta (Stoll, [1780])
E. b. hainana (Moore, 1878) Hainan
E. b. rubella (Wallace, 1867) South China
E. b. yunnana (Mell, 1943) Yunnan
Eurema hecabe (Linnaeus, 1758)
E. h. albina Huang, 1994 Fujian
Eurema laeta (Boisduval, 1836)
E. l. sikkima (Moore, [1906]) Hainan
genus: Gandaca
Gandaca harina (Horsfield, 1829)
genus: Gonepteryx
Gonepteryx rhamni (Linnaeus, 1758)
G. r. tianshanica Nekrutenko, 1970 Tian Shan
Gonepteryx mahaguru Gistel, 1857 East China
G. m. alvinda (Blanchard, 1871) Tibet, Yunnan
Gonepteryx maxima Butler, 1885 Northeast China
G. m. amurensis Graeser, 1888 Amur, Ussuri
Gonepteryx acuminata C. Felder & R. Felder, 1862 Ning-Po
Gonepteryx amintha Blanchard, 1871
G. a. limonia Mell, 1943 Ussuri, Yunnan
G. a. thibetana Nekrutenko, 1968 Tibet
genus: Ixias
Ixias pyrene Linnaeus 1764
genus: Leptidea
Leptidea morsei Fenton, [1882] Ussuri, North China
Leptidea amurensis Ménétriés, 1859
Leptidea gigantea (Leech, 1890)
Leptidea lactea Lorkovic, 1950 Tapaischan, China
Leptidea serrata Lee, 1955
genus: Leptosia
Leptosia nina (Fabricius, 1793)
genus: Mesapia
Mesapia peloria (Hewitson, 1853)
genus: Pareronia
Pareronia valeria (Cramer, [1776])
genus: Pieris
Pieris brassicae (Linnaeus, 1758) China
 P. b. nepalensis Gray, 1846 Yunnan
 P. b. ottonis Röber, 1907 Tian Shan
Pieris naganum (Moore, 1884)
 P. n. cisseis Leech, 1890 Houpe, Tsekiang, Honan, Fukien, Guangxi, Guangdong, Hainan
Pieris napi (Linnaeus, 1758)
 P. n. banghaasi Sheljuzhko, 1910 Tian Shan
 P. n. muchei Eitschberger, [1984] Tian Shan
Pieris bryoniae (Hübner, [1790-1793])
 P. b. bryonides Sheljuzhko, 1910 Tian Shan
Pieris narina Verity, 1908 Tian Shan
Pieris ochsenheimeri Staudinger, 1886 Tian Shan
Pieris dulcinea (Butler, 1882)
 P. d. dulcinea (Butler, 1882) Amur, Ussuri
Pieris melete Ménétriés, 1857
 P. m. orientis Oberthür, 1880 Ussuri
 P. m. mandarina Leech, 1893 North China
 P. m. melaina Röber, 1907 Tibet, South China
 P. m. alpestris Verity, 1908 Sichuan
 P. m. australis Verity, 1911 Yunnan
Pieris canidia (Linnaeus, 1768) West China, Tibet
 P. c. minima Verity, 1908 Tibet
 P. c. mars Bang-Haas, 1927 Kansu
 P. c. indica Evans, 1926 Yunnan
Pieris extensa Poujade, 1888 West China
 P. e. latouchei Mell, 1939 Fukien
Pieris rapae (Linnaeus, 1758) China
 P. r. crucivora Boisduval, 1836 Amur, Ussuri
 P. r. debilis Alphéraky, 1889 Tian Shan
 P. r. yunnana Mell, 1943 South China
Pieris erutae Poujade, 1888 Yunnan
Pieris deota  (de Nicéville, 1884)
Pieris krueperi Staudinger, 1860
Pieris steinigeri  Eitschberger, 1984 Weihsi
Pieris chumbiensis (de Nicéville, 1897)
genus: Pontia
Pontia daplidice (Linnaeus, 1758)
P. d. moorei (Röber, [1907]) Yunnan
P. d. amphimara (Fruhstorfer, 1908) Szetchuan
Pontia callidice (Hübner, [1799-1800]) China, Tibet
P. c. amaryllis Hemming, 1933 Tian Shan
P. c. halasia Huang & Murayama, 1992 Xinjiang
Pontia chloridice (Hübner, 1813)
genus: Prioneris
Prioneris clemanthe Doubleday, 1846
P. c. euclemanthe Fruhstorfer, 1903 Hainan
Prioneris thestylis Doubleday, 1842
P. t. formosana Fruhstorfer, 1903 Taiwan
P. t. hainanensis Fruhstorfer, 1910 Hainan
genus: Sinopieris
Sinopieris dubernardi (Oberthür, 1884)
S. d. dubernardi (Oberthür, 1884) Yunnan, Sichuan
S. d. kozlovi (Alphéraky, 1897) Nanshan
S. d. gyantsensis (Verity, 1911) Tibet
S. d. rothschildi (Verity, 1911) Shaanxi
S. d. bromkampi (Bang-Haas, 1938) Gansu
S. d. wangi Huang, 1998 Tibet
S. d. pomiensis (Yoshino, 1998) Tibet
Sinopieris davidis (Oberthür, 1876)
S. d. davidis (Oberthür, 1876) Yunnan
S. d. diluta (Verity, 1911)
Sinopieris stoetzneri (Draeseke, 1924) Yunnan, Sichuan
Sinopieris venata (Leech, 1891) Ta-chien-lu
Sinopieris kozlovi (Alphéraky, 1897)
S. k. kozlov i (Alphéraky, 1897) Nanshan
S. k. aljinensis (Huang & Murayama, 1992) Xinjiang
genus: Zegris
Zegris pyrothoe (Eversmann, 1832) West China

References

Chou, I. (ed) 1994. Monographia Rhopalocerorum Sinensium (Monograph of Chinese Butterflies). Henan Scientific and Technological Publishing House, Zhengzhou.(in Chinese). . Lists species plus new distribution records for China. New species descriptions are noted in English. Colour photographs of the species treated, with accompanying Chinese text.
Full list references.

External links
Catalogue of life China List provided by Chinese Academy of Sciencesonline here
Butterflies of China at Digital Moths of Japan. Includes images.
Wikispecies taxonomy additional references via species or genus
Acta Zootaxonomica Sinica

Lists of butterflies of China